The Professional Footballers' Association of Ireland Players' Player of the Year (often called the PFAI Players' Player of the Year, the Players' Player of the Year, or simply the Irish Player of the Year) award is given to the footballer the League of Ireland Premier Division, who is seen to have been the best player of the previous season.

The shortlist is compiled by the members of the Professional Footballers' Association of Ireland (the PFAI), and then the winner is voted for by the other players in the league. The prize is regarded as the highest awarded by the PFAI and is seen as the primary "Player of the Year" award in Ireland.

The award was first given in 1981, and was won by Athlone Town player Padraig O'Connor. The latest winner of the award is Rory Gaffney of Shamrock Rovers.

List of winners
Highlighted players are winning the award for a second time.

2020s

2010s

2000s

1990s

1980s

Breakdown of winners

Winners by club

Winners by country

See also
PFAI Young Player of the Year
PFAI Team of the Year

References

External links
Professional Footballers Association of Ireland

Ireland, PFAI Professional Footballers Association of Ireland Player of the Year
Awards established in 1981
1981 establishments in Ireland
Annual events in Ireland
 
League of Ireland Premier Division
Association football player non-biographical articles